{{DISPLAYTITLE:C24H40N5O8}}
The molecular formula C24H40N5O8 (molar mass: 526.603 g/mol, exact mass: 526.2877 u) may refer to:

 Desmosine
 Isodesmosine

Molecular formulas